Farm Gate may refer to:

 Farmgate, a neighbourhood in Dhaka, named after a historical farm gate at that location.
 Farmgate, a 2022 scandal involving the theft of money from South African president Ramaphosa's game farm in 2020.
 Operation Farm Gate, a United States Air Force operation during the Vietnam War.
 Farm gate value, the net value of an agricultural good when it leaves an agricultural operation.
 Farm gate marketing, a form of direct marketing strategy employed by agricultural producers.
 Farm gate, a gate at the entrance to a farm